Ronald James Northey (April 26, 1920 – April 16, 1971) was an American professional baseball player and coach. He was an outfielder for the Philadelphia Phillies (1942–44, 1946–47 and 1957), St. Louis Cardinals (1947–49), Cincinnati Reds (1950), Chicago Cubs (1950 and 1952) and Chicago White Sox (1955–57). His son, Scott Northey, also was a Major League outfielder.

Early life
Northey graduated from Frackville High School and went to Duke University.

Military service
Northey was drafted into the United States Army in 1945 and conducted his initial training at New Cumberland Army Reception Center near Harrisburg, Pennsylvania. He was subsequently based at Fort Lewis, Washington and was discharged in 1946. He played baseball while serving in the army.

Baseball career
Ron Northey finished 29th in voting for the 1943 National League MVP, and 18th in voting for the 1944 NL MVP. In 12 MLB seasons, he played in 1,084 games and had 3,172 at bats, with 385 runs scored, 874 hits, 172 doubles, 28 triples, 108 home runs, 513 runs batted in, seven stolen bases, 361 walks, a .276 batting average, .352 on-base percentage, .450 slugging percentage, 1,426 total bases and 14 sacrifice hits. Northey was especially adept as a pinch hitter: he appeared in 297 games as an emergency batsman and batted .288, with 69 hits—including nine pinch homers, eight doubles and two triples, and 75 runs batted in. In , as a member of the White Sox, he batted .385 and collected 15 pinch hits, with three homers and 21 RBI.

Northey was a coach on the staff of skipper Danny Murtaugh, his former teammate on the early 1940s Phillies, with the Pittsburgh Pirates from 1961 to 1963. He died suddenly in Pittsburgh at the age of 50 after being taken ill at his home.  He is buried at Fairfield Memorial Park, Stamford, Connecticut.

References

External links

 The Deadball Era

1920 births
1971 deaths
Baseball players from Pennsylvania
Buffalo Bisons (minor league) players
Charleston Senators players
Chicago Cubs players
Chicago White Sox players
Chicago White Sox scouts
Cincinnati Reds players
Federalsburg A's players
Indianapolis Indians players
Los Angeles Angels (minor league) players
Major League Baseball first base coaches
Major League Baseball right fielders
Minneapolis Millers (baseball) players
People from Mahanoy City, Pennsylvania
Philadelphia Phillies players
Pittsburgh Pirates coaches
St. Louis Cardinals players
United States Army personnel of World War II
Williamsport Grays players